Valley Township is an inactive township in Macon County, in the U.S. state of Missouri.

Valley Township was originally called Loe Township; the present name was adopted in 1872,.

References

Townships in Missouri
Townships in Macon County, Missouri